Hardin–Simmons University (HSU) is a private Baptist university in Abilene, Texas. It is affiliated with the Baptist General Convention of Texas (Southern Baptist Convention).

History

Hardin–Simmons University was founded as Abilene Baptist College in 1891 by the Sweetwater Baptist Association and a group of cattlemen and pastors who sought to bring Christian higher education to the Southwest. The purpose of the school would be "to lead students to Christ, teach them of Christ, and train them for Christ."  The original land was donated to the university by rancher C.W. Merchant. It was the first school of higher education established in Texas west of Fort Worth. The school was renamed Simmons College in 1892 in honor of an early contributor, James B. Simmons. By 1907 it claimed an enrollment of 524 and a staff of 49.  In 1925, it became Simmons University.  It was renamed Hardin–Simmons University in 1934 in honor of Mary and John G. Hardin, who were also major contributors.  The university has been associated with the Baptist General Convention of Texas since 1941.

The university publicly experienced financial challenges in the late 2010s continuing into 2020 as the state and the Baptist General Convention of Texas reduced the funding levels of programs in which the university participates. In 2018, the university ended 9 undergraduate and 4 graduate programs and closed 5 campus extensions (Logsdon Seminary campuses in Coppell, Lubbock, Corpus Christi and McAllen; Acton MBA Program in Austin). These changes also included terminations of staff and faculty. Two years later, in 2020, the university announced that it would close Logsdon Seminary and end an additional 22 academic programs with accompanying terminations of staff and faculty.

The university was granted an exception to Title IX in 2016 which allows it to legally discriminate against LGBT students for religious reasons.

Presidents
 1892–1894           W.C. Friley       
 1894–1898           George O. Thatcher  
 1898–1901           O.C. Pope     
 1901–1902           C.R. Hairfield    
 1902–1909           Oscar Henry Cooper
 1909–1940           Jefferson Davis Sandefer Sr.
 1940–1940           Lucian Q. Campbell  (acting president)
 1940–1943           William R. White      
 1943–1953           Rupert N. Richardson–Wrote the personal reflection, Famous Are Thy Halls: Hardin–Simmons University As I Have Known It (1964)
 1953–1962           Evan Allard Reiff       
 1962–1963           George L. Graham (interim)
 1963–1966           James H. Landes       
 1966–1977           Elwin L. Skiles            
 1977–1991           Jesse C. Fletcher       
 1991–2001           Lanny Hall    
 2001–2008           W. Craig Turner         
 2009–2016           Lanny Hall     
 2016–               Eric Bruntmyer

Academics

HSU offers six undergraduate degrees with 70 majors, and seven graduate degrees with 18 programs. Pre-professional programs include dentistry, engineering, medicine, law, pharmacology, physical therapy, and seminary.  HSU offers courses in geography, Greek, Hebrew, humanities, and physical sciences, as well.  The university offers a doctorate in physical therapy, the first in Texas which is open to private citizens, as well as Doctor of Education (Ed.D.).

HSU students come from diverse backgrounds and a variety of Christian denominations. With an approximate enrollment of 2,500 students, the student-to-teacher ratio was 33:1.

Rankings
In 2016, U.S. News & World Report ranked Hardin-Simmons 33 among Regional Universities in the West.  That same year, Princeton Review included the university among its Best Western Colleges.

In 2016 Campus Pride ranked the university among the worst schools in Texas for LGBT students.

Accreditation 
It is affiliated with the Baptist General Convention of Texas (Southern Baptist Convention).

Campus life
Chapel services are held weekly for the entire student body. Neighborhood outreach programs are also available in which students can participate. Baptist Student Ministries (BSM) offers free noon lunches for students every Wednesday. The BSM provides possibilities for students to get involved in Bible study groups and go on mission trips, in addition to hosting concerts and other campus events.

Campus resources include career services, a writing center, academic advisors, library services, faculty mentors, disability services, health services, peer mentors, and counseling. HSU’s grounds include six residence halls and eight apartment complexes as well as campus houses. Campus infrastructure is built in classic brick architecture, and the school’s golden-domed, red brick clock tower serves as its signature building, along with the 30 by 41-ft stained glass wall of Logsdon chapel, on the campus' southeast corner. HSU was named one of the 50 Most Beautiful Christian Colleges and Universities in 2017.

Western Heritage Day
Western Heritage Day is an annual celebration of the heritage and way of life in the American frontier that has occurred since the Abilene Centennial Celebration in 1981. The event is held on the HSU campus and includes activities such as trick roping, pit branding, chuck wagon snacks, and a small farm animal petting area. The activities have become a fun educational opportunity for Abilene-area elementary school-aged children.

Athletics
The Hardin–Simmons athletic teams are called the Cowboys/Cowgirls. The university is a member of the Division III level of the National Collegiate Athletic Association (NCAA), primarily competing in the American Southwest Conference since the 1996–97 academic year.  had won 75 conference titles, the most of any school. The Cowboys/Cowgirls also competed in the Division III-based Texas Intercollegiate Athletic Association (TIAA) from 1990–91 to 1995–96.

Hardin–Simmons previously competed as a member of the Border Intercollegiate Athletic Association (BIAA; also known as the Border Conference) from 1941–42 to 1961–62, during which time the football team won three conference championships. For the first 15 years after HSU restarted its football program (1990–2005), the Hardin–Simmons Cowboy football team had the best winning percentage (77.4%) of all Texan college football programs. Also, the men's basketball team won two Border Conference titles, in 1953 and 1957, advancing to the NCAA basketball tournament each time. The Cowboys are one of fourteen teams to have played in the tournament and no longer be in Division I; they are also one of five such teams to have appeared in more than one tournament.

Hardin–Simmons competes in 16 intercollegiate varsity sports: Men's sports include baseball, basketball, cross country, football, golf, soccer, tennis and track & field; while women's sports include basketball, cross country, golf, soccer, softball, tennis, track & field and volleyball.

Women's soccer
Hardin–Simmons women's soccer has been HSU's single-most successful athletic program with 22 ASC Conference Championships in the 1996-2019 period, and an NCAA Division III National Championship title in 2010.

Notable alumni

Naim Ateek — Palestinian theologian
John Leland Atwood — former chief engineer for North American Aviation, instrumental in the production of the P-51 Mustang and B-25 Mitchell
Owen J. Baggett - American pilot famous for shooting down an aircraft with his pistol
Earl Bennett — former NFL football player
Dan Blocker — attended one year before transferring to Sul Ross State University in Alpine, Texas. Played the role of 'Hoss' on the 1960s American TV show Bonanza
Doyle "Texas Dolly" Brunson — poker legend
Omar Burleson – represented Abilene in the United States Congress from Texas's 17th congressional district from 1947-1978.
Harvey Catchings — former NBA basketball player
Matt Chandler – pastor of Village Church and president of Acts 29 Network
Gene Cockrell — American football player
Don Collier — western film and television actor
Roy Crane — cartoonist (Wash Tubbs, Captain Easy)
Jack Graham — pastor, Prestonwood Baptist Church, former president of the Southern Baptist Convention
Terri Hendrix - singer-songwriter
Stedman Graham — businessman and speaker, long-time partner of Oprah Winfrey 
Jeff Iorg — president of the Golden Gate Baptist Theological Seminary
Jack T. Martin — American collegiate basketball player/coach, former Brevet Brigadier General Texas Air National Guard
W. Francis McBeth — composer
Bob McChesney — American football player
Mildred Paxton Moody – journalist, preservationist, and First Lady of Texas, 1927–1931
Fess Parker — portrayed Davy Crockett in the Davy Crockett miniseries on Walt Disney's ABC  miniseries and Daniel Boone on NBC's Daniel Boone
Leighton Paige Patterson — former president of the Southern Baptist Convention and former president of Southwestern Baptist Theological Seminary
Rupert N. Richardson — president of Hardin–Simmons from 1943–1953
Harold Stephens — professional football player
Clyde "Bulldog" Turner — member of the Pro Football Hall of Fame
Will Wagner — head football coach at Angelo State University
George E. "Buddy" West — former Texas state representative
Willis Whitfield — inventor of the cleanroom
Phil Wilson — former Secretary of State of Texas
C. V. Wood — entrepreneur who relocated London Bridge to Lake Havasu City, Arizona

Notable faculty
 Wayne Millner (1913–1976), American football player
 Norma Wendelburg, composer

References

External links

 
 Official athletics website

 
Universities and colleges in Abilene, Texas
Liberal arts colleges in Texas
Private universities and colleges in Texas
Schools in Taylor County, Texas
Universities and colleges affiliated with the Southern Baptist Convention
Universities and colleges affiliated with the Baptist General Convention of Texas
Educational institutions established in 1891
1891 establishments in Texas
Council for Christian Colleges and Universities
Universities and colleges accredited by the Southern Association of Colleges and Schools